The American Sportscopter Ultrasport 331 is an American helicopter that was designed and produced by American Sportscopter of Newport News, Virginia. Now out of production, when it was available the aircraft was supplied as a kit for amateur construction.

Design and development
The Ultrasport 331 is a development of the Ultrasport 254 and, like that model, is named for its empty weight in pounds. The aircraft was designed to comply with the US Experimental - Amateur-built aircraft rules. It features a single main rotor, a single-seat enclosed cockpit with doors, skid-type landing gear and a twin cylinder, air-cooled, two-stroke, dual-ignition  Hirth 2706 engine.

The aircraft fuselage is made from composites. The cyclic control is mounted from the cockpit ceiling, but otherwise is conventional. The horizontal tailplane mounts end-fins for directional stability.

The manufacturer estimated the construction time from the supplied kit as 60 hours.

Operational history
By June 2014 three examples had been registered in the United States with the Federal Aviation Administration, although a total of six had been registered at one time.

Specifications (Ultrasport 331)

See also
List of rotorcraft

References

External links
Photo of an American Sportscopter Ultrasport 331

Ultrasport 331
2000s United States sport aircraft
2000s United States helicopters
Homebuilt aircraft
Single-engined piston helicopters